Nikhil Chinapa is an Indian DJ, host and festival curator, often credited with popularizing EDM among the youth in India. He is also known as the Father of Indian Dance Music for his various contributions towards revolutionising the outlook of Dance Music throughout the Indian Subcontinent.  He has been associated with MTV India since the late 1990s and has appeared in multiple television shows including Roadies and Splitsvilla. He has been instrumental in popularizing DJing as a profession and leading the music scene at the Sunburn Festival in its early years.

Early life 
Chinapa was born in Bangalore. His father was a paratrooper in the Indian Army, and as a result he did his early education from different schools in India, including Begumpet's Hyderabad Public School, Hyderabad and Faust High School, Secundarabad, after which he studied in St. George High School Agra. He earned a degree in Architecture from BMS College of Engineering in Bangalore with a thesis on the design of hospitals. His interest in music grew during his college life when he used to do gigs as a DJ in parties to earn his pocket money.

Personal life
Chinapa married his long-time girlfriend DJ Pearl Miglani in 2012 after a six-year-long relationship. In February 2018, they welcomed their daughter.

Career
Chinapa's career as a television personality started when he won the MTV VJ Hunt in 1999. Thereon he hosted MTV Select, a show which introduced popular music and bands from the various parts of the world. In 2000 he debuted as an actor with the film Snip!. Later, he hosted shows like India's Got Talent 2 with Ayushmann Khurana and several seasons of MTV Splitsvilla. He also judged shows like Rock On, MTV Mashups, Fame X and seasons 4, 5 and 7 of MTV Roadies. Since the thirteenth season of Roadies, Chinapa has been playing the role of a gang leader in the show.

Chinapa co-founded Submerge in 2003 along with his wife Pearl and Hermit Sethi; it went on to be one of the largest EDM companies in India. In 2007, he co-founded   Sunburn, but parted ways with the franchise in 2013 due to internal issues and co-founded Vh1 Supersonic with his wife Pearl. It continues to be one of India’s biggest dance music festivals.

Filmography

Films

Television

Discography

Stop! ("Nachle - Remix") (2004)
Salaam Namaste (Salaam Namaste (Dhol Mix)) (2005) along with DJ Naved Khan
Dus (Z version, "Deedar De") (2005)
Zinda (Writer: "Maula", "Maula - Remix", "Zinda Hoon Main", "Zinda Hoon Main - Remix") (2006)
Shootout at Lokhandwala ("Unke Nashe Mein - Remix", "Aakhri Alvida - Remix") (2007)
Om Shanti Om (Writer: "Dastaan-E-Om Shanti Om" (The Dark Side)) (2007)

Accolades

See also
Sunburn Festival
List of MTV VJs

References

External links

 Nikhil Chinapa's Online School
 
 About page on the official website of Submerge, The Music company co-founded by Nikhil Chinapa

1973 births
21st-century Indian male actors
Living people
People from Bangalore
Indian VJs (media personalities)
Indian game show hosts
Indian DJs
Festival directors